The Chiesa del Sacro Cuore (Church of the Sacred Heart) is located in Via Capo di Mondo in Florence.

Ludovico da Casoria, a Franciscan priest, founder of the Congregation of Frati Bigi, had the church built between 1874 and 1877, on the model of San Salvatore al Monte. The church is situated in Firenze (Campo di Marte). In 1941 it became a parish church and the building was completely restructured by the architect Lando Bartoli between 1956 and 1962. For the extremely modern bell tower the architect was assisted by Pier Luigi Nervi. There is a stained glass window of the Resurrection by Marcello Avelani, bronze doors and ceramic saints by Angelo Biancini, mosaic Stations of the Cross by Giovanni Haynal, a crucifix by Umberto Bartoli, a 16th-century Madonna and Child, a Last Supper by Giovanni Stradano and the Apparition of the Sacred Heart by Antonio Ciseri (1880).

Gallery

References

Roman Catholic churches in Florence
19th-century Roman Catholic church buildings in Italy
Pier Luigi Nervi buildings
Roman Catholic churches completed in the 1960s
Modernist architecture in Italy